Events from the year 1514 in India.

Events
 Rani Sipri's Mosque commissioned.

Births
 Meherji Rana Parsi spiritual leader (died 1591)

See also
 Timeline of Indian history

References